Marcus Gilbert (born 29 July 1958) is a British actor.

Since 1984 he has appeared in films, including The Masks of Death (1984), Biggles (1986), A Hazard of Hearts (1987), Rambo III (1988), A Ghost in Monte Carlo (1990), Legacy (1990), Army of Darkness (1992) and Freebird (2008), on television (Including Doctor Who in Battlefield in 1989), and in commercials. He has also worked in the theatre, including playing the young Viscount Goring in Oscar Wilde's An Ideal Husband with the Middle Ground Theatre Company on their national tour in 2000. In 2006, Gilbert starred as Jordan Power in the world premiere of Starry Starry Night, at The Mill at Sonning.

Career 
After graduating from the Mountview Theatre School in 1981, Gilbert became a founder member of the original Odyssey Theatre Company, touring London schools with productions of contemporary classics. This was followed by seasons working in the Dundee Repertory Theatre and the Library Theatre, Manchester.

Gilbert has made over fifty commercials, including one for Lee Jeans called Mean Jeans, directed by Willi Patterson, which won the best cinema commercial award in 1986.

Gilbert also runs his own film production company, Touch the Sky Productions, and in 2004 while making a documentary about his climbing Mount Kilimanjaro he visited the Arusha Children's Trust in Tanzania and filmed an appeal for the trust.

Filmography

Footnotes

External links

Middle Ground Theatre Company
Marcus Gilbert official website
unofficial Marcus Gilbert fansite
The Mill at Sonning
The Arusha Children's Trust
Mountview Academy of Theatre Arts
Willi Patterson Films

1958 births
British male film actors
British male soap opera actors
Living people
Male actors from Bristol
Alumni of the Mountview Academy of Theatre Arts